Sex Work in Shanghai within the 19th and 20th Century lead China to become known as the "brothel of Asia." With Shanghai's rapid expansion of factories, migration, and refugees, gangs and prostitution quickly spread through the city. This resulted in the exploitation of young women and children, sex trafficking, and imperialist policies. In addition, social turmoil within the mid 19th century such as the Taiping civil war shifted the economic and political state of Shanghai. This furthered the rise of prostitution to rapidly spread. A clear hierarchy within the sex industry soon began to develop creating a large class distinction between the sex workers. This forced many young woman to work tireless to reach ends meet while others were able to live lives of luxury.

The policies and laws that soon followed sought to eradicate sex work within China. However, despite being able to outlaw sex work, these policies were a turning point that revolutionized the industry. At the turn of the Maoist period, sex work returned to the spot light in a whole new way leading to what we see now in the 21st century.

History 
During the 19th century, Shanghai's abundance in agriculture and manufacturing ability made it one of the most sought out cities to work in. In addition, between 1851-1864, the Taiping civil war occurred followed by the Small Swords Uprising of 1853-1855 forced many people to migrate to Shanghai. However, these turmoils allowed for foreign countries such as the French and British to dominate large portions of the city. It also allowed for the widespread increase of gangs and prostitutes in Shanghai.

As the 20th century approached, Shanghai became one of the largest entrepôts in the world. It dominated in the export of textiles and this resulted in the rapid increase of factories to keep up with the demand. Furthermore, mostly only women worked in these textile factories.

Between the early to mid 20th century, there was an inundation of refugees and migrants that came to Shanghai to flee violence and Japanese control. This resulted in competition within the workforce and led to many people being unemployed, especially women. Those who were not able to find work could only resort to sex work.

With so many women unemployed and turning to sex work to stay alive with the addition of men increasingly demanding sexual services, Shanghai became known as the "brothel of Asia."

Political and Social Changes 

Despite Shanghai's reputation as one of the largest cities for sex work at the time, sex work was completely shunned. Especially during the Maoist period, sex work was met with retribution and damnation.

In addition to laws being passed to eradicate prostitution, Confucian ideals played a major role in pressuring men and women to stay away from prostitution. Within these ideals, everyone was seen as "innately good and educable." Men were also expected to be loyal to their families and avoid all risks.

Prostitution in Shanghai was officially outlawed in 1949. However until then, there was heated debate about whether it should be just strong regulated due to its strong contribution to Shanghai economically throughout the 19th and early 20th century.

Nevertheless, in 1949 it was decided that prostitution in all of China was to be outlawed. Between 1950-1951, there was a movement that sought out to eradicate all revolutionaries that went against the ban on prostitution. 200 people were put to death and over 7,000 people were on suspended death sentences or life sentences by the People's Court of Shanghai. Many of these people were brothels owners which led to the shutdown of most brothels around the nation.

Eventually, prostitution was claimed to be eradicated by 1958. Even so that venereal disease clinics were deemed unnecessary. Therefore, they were all closed by 1965.

However, this quickly changed as the Maoist period began to draw its close by 1976. During Deng Xiaoping's reform, sex work began to quickly come back to light in a whole new form. Rather than brothels, sex work was now found in dance halls, salons, barbershops, coffeehouses, train-stations, theaters, karaoke bars, and even parks. Much of the time, sex workers lived in the places they worked to prevent being caught and with the addition of technology at the end of the 20th century, workers were able to keep in touch with their clients easily.

The end of the 20th century was also met with a surplus amount of migrants entering Shanghai, this played a major role in reigniting the sex industry. However, it also led to trafficking and exploitation.

Types of Sex Work and Exploitation 

The addition of so many migrants entering Shanghai also came with the addition of increased sex trafficking and exploitation.

At the time, most of the sex trafficking that occurred was consensual. It took place at the consent of the woman and her family. This was typically due to the fact that families were desperate and pressured in times of poverty.

However, kidnappings and abductions commonly took place as well. Stories of these occurring were very common. For example, the 1929 court case against a woman named Zhou née Chen revolved around the story that Zhou had tried to trick two young teenage girls into working as servants but was in fact planning on trafficking them.

Women were commonly used as abductors because they could relatively allow other women and children to let their guard down making the kidnappings easier. It was also evident that during these abductions, women were raped by their abductors between the time of their sales.

During the Maoist period, the use of brothels was commonly seen. Children of sex workers were brought up in these brothels and were even trained to do work especially young girls. Clients would commonly pay higher prices for young girls and virgins because it was believed that they were free from HIV/AIDS.

Homosexuality was shunned upon during the Maoist era leading to male sex work being suppressed in the 19th-20th century. However, male sex work was still seen commonly throughout Chinese literature and art.

Despite the suppression of male sex work, a recent study has shown that over a third of Chinese sex workers were male migrants.

In addition, transgender sex workers have little to no mention in historical documents in Shanghai. However, it is clear like male sex workers, they were most likely harassed, abused, and treated harshly.

Sex Work Hierarchy 

Before the sex work was outlawed in Shanghai, there were four major categories that made up the sex work hierarchy.

At the top of the hierarchy were "storytellers." These women were high-class courtesan and were entertainers. They were known to do music, poetry, dance, and dramatics. However, they did not have sex with their clients and were typically only seen to be with scholar-officials.

Next in the hierarchy are "sing-song girls." These women were also high-class courtesans that held parties, banquets, and wore costumes for officials and merchants.

For these high-class courtesans, prostitution was not the main objective. Most of the revenue came from gambling, song requests, banquets, and gifts. Sex only played as a minor role in contributing to their revenue.

"Tea-house" prostitutes followed next in line. These sex workers were more known to have sex with their clients rather than entertain them like "sing song girls" or "story tellers."

Finally, the remaining sex workers were called "wild chicks." These sex workers were typically streetwalkers and only performed sex with clients in brothels or other low end locations.

Addition information about the hierarchy of sex workers in Shanghai can be found in Prostitution in China.

Sex Culture 
The lifestyle of sex workers greatly depended on where they ranked on the sex work hierarchy. Poor streetwalkers commonly desperate for money and sought out as many clients as they could. Only the other side, higher class sex workers such as "sing-song girls" or "storytellers" would meet as many clients as they pleased typically ranging from one or two per day in high end courtesan houses.

These courtesan houses would get "secondary" prostitutes to tend to the sexual needs of the high number of clientele and their demands. This allowed for their upper level counterparts to only deal with the best clients.

These courtesan houses were often run by a madam who oversaw the houses and the business. Madams would develop contractual relationships with courtesans to allow for them to work in the houses. A small portion of courtesans even became madams of their own houses towards the lateral parts of their careers.

Even after the 19th and 20th century, high end sex workers continue to live in luxury especially in comparison to their counterparts who work in "ten yuan" brothels which is equivalent to $2 USD.

Sex workers on the lower end of the spectrum rely on a code of conduct and will only accept men who accept these rules. This helps protect the sex workers as much as possible from potentially dangerous clients.

Sex workers on the lower end of the spectrum that worked in collective houses had to meet a fixed goal of money made based on their contract. If these women failed to meet their goal, they would be forced to pay compensation for lost of revenue.

Within China, there are no pimps who oversee the sex workers. Rather there are "managers" who work the venues that these sex workers work typically in bars, clubs, and karaoke bars. Despite helping protecting the sex workers, they nearly enslave them not letting them leave their location of work.

For the courtesan houses, men were referred to as "guinu" and they were there to protect the house from any dangers that might occur. These men were typically lovers of the madam.

References 

Wikipedia Student Program
Shanghai
Prostitution in China